Pandemis thomasi is a species of moth of the family Tortricidae. It is endemic to India (Jammu and Kashmir).

The ground colour of the forewings is brownish. The hindwings are brownish.

Etymology
The species is named in honour of Dr. W. Thomas who collected and donated the Indian Tortricidae chiefly from Kashmir and Ladakh.

References

External links

Moths described in 2006
Moths of Asia
Pandemis
Taxa named by Józef Razowski